The DICE framework is a tool originally developed by Perry Keenan, Kathleen Conlon, and Alan Jackson (all current or former Partners at The Boston Consulting Group). It was originally published at Harvard Business Review (HBR) article The Hard Side of Change in 2005 and has been republished in HBR's "Lead Change--Successfully", HBR's OnPoint Magazine was recognized in HBR's "10 Must Reads on Change Management" publication. The DICE framework was awarded a patent in 2014.

A DICE score is an indicator of the likely success of a project based on various measures. The DICE framework attempts consistency in evaluating various projects with subjective inputs and can be used to track and manage portfolios of projects. Using this framework, leaders can predict project outcomes and allocate resources strategically to maximize delivery of an overall program or portfolio of initiatives.

Although, originally developed at The Boston Consulting Group (BCG), this framework has become widely adopted and is used by many companies and professionals.

DICE Acronym 
The acronym DICE stands for:

Duration (D) either the total duration of short projects, or the time between two milestones on longer projects
Team Performance Integrity (I) the project team's ability to execute successfully, with specific emphasis on the ability of the project leader
Commitment (C) levels of support, composed of two factors:
C1 visible backing from the sponsor and senior executives for the change
C2 support from those who are impacted by the change
Effort (E) how much effort will it require to implement (above and beyond business as usual)

Calculation 
Based on the statistical analysis from the outcome of change projects, success can be determined by assessing four factors (duration, team performance integrity, commitment, and effort). A DICE score between 7 and 14 is in the "Win" Zone (very likely to succeed), while a DICE score between 14 and 17 falls in the "Worry" Zone (hard to predict success), and a DICE score higher than 17 falls in the "Woe" Zone (indicating high unpredictability or likely to not succeed). The DICE score is calculated according to the following formula:
 D + (2 x I) + (2 x C1) + C2 + E
Duration
< 2 months = 1
2-4 months = 2
4-8 months = 3
> 8 months = 4

Team Performance Integrity
Very good = 1
Good = 2
Average = 3
Poor = 4

Commitment (Senior Management)
Clearly and strongly communicate the need = 1
Seem to want success = 2
Neutral = 3
Reluctant = 4

Commitment (Local)
Eager = 1
Willing = 2
Reluctant = 3
Strongly Reluctant = 4

Effort
< 10% additional = 1 
10-20% additional = 2
20-40% additional = 3
> 40 % additional = 4

References 

Change management
Project management techniques
Leadership